St James' GAA (Cork) is a Gaelic Athletic Association club based in the parish of Ardfield–Rathbarry, in Cork, Republic of Ireland. The club has both hurling and Gaelic football teams. The club is part of Cork GAA and also part of the Carbery GAA division. Whilst the club has traditionally been primarily a Gaelic football one, hurling has grown in the 21st century. The club, like the parish has often been nicknamed "the Mountain". They are competitive in both Junior 'A' codes in the division.

St James' won the Carbery Junior A Football championship in 2019 after defeating Ballinascarthy 0-11 to 0-9 in the final. It was their first ever title at this grade.

St James' reached their first ever Junior A County Football Final in 2019, beating Cobh in Round 1 (2.17 to 0.02), beating Boherbue in the quarter final (1.11 to 0.12) and beating St. Michael's in the semi final (1.12 to 0.09) but lost out in the final to Kilshannig GAA (0-22 - 0-11)

Achievements
 Cork Junior Football Championship Runner's up 2019
 South West Junior A Football Championship  Winners (2) 2019, 2022
 All-Ireland Junior B Club Hurling Championship  Runners-up  2005
 Munster Junior B Club Hurling Championship Winners (1) 2005
 Cork Junior B Hurling Championship Winners (1) 2005
 South West Cork Junior B Hurling Championship Winners (1) 2005
 South West Cork  Junior B Football Championship Winners (5) 1929, 1946, 1948, 1981, 2005  Runners-Up 1968, 1970, 1975, 1997
 South West Cork  Junior C Football Championship Winners (1) 2021
 South West Cork  Junior D Football Championship Winners (1) 2009  Runners-Up 2001, 2006
 South West Cork  Minor C Hurling Championship Winners (2) 1996, 2001  Runners-Up 2004, 2007, 2008, 2009
 South West Cork  Minor C Football Championship Winners (3) 1995, 2000, 2006
 South West Cork  Under-21 B Hurling Championship Winners (1) 2002  Runners-Up 2000
 South West Cork  Under-21 B Football Championship Winners (1) 2005  Runners-Up 2008
 South West Cork  Under-21 C Football Championship Winners (1) 1995  Runners-Up 2014
 South West Cork  Under-21 C Hurling Championship Winners (1) 1998

References

External sources
St James' club website

Gaelic games clubs in County Cork
Hurling clubs in County Cork
Gaelic football clubs in County Cork